Kristine Nitzsche (born 1 June 1959 in Leipzig) is a retired East German athlete who competed in the pentathlon and high jump.

Biography
She won both events at the 1977 European Junior Championships. At the 1978 European Championships she won the bronze medal in the pentathlon and finished eleventh in the high jump. She represented the sports team SC Cottbus and won the silver medal at the 1979 East German championships. Her personal best jump was 1.95 metres, achieved in July 1979 in Schielleiten. She won the Hochsprung mit Musik in 1979 with a then meet record of 1.86 m.

References

1959 births
Living people
East German female high jumpers
East German pentathletes
Athletes from Leipzig
European Athletics Championships medalists
People from Bezirk Leipzig